The Colorado Division of Insurance was established by the Colorado General Assembly in 1879.
It became part of the Department of Regulatory Agencies (DORA) in 1968.

The chief executive officer of the Division is the Commissioner of Insurance. The Commissioner is appointed by the governor, 
Prior to 1906, the commissioner was known as the Superintendent of Insurance and was under the State Auditor, and until 1984 was a state employee. In 1984 the position changed to become a gubernatorial appointee.

The Colorado Division of Insurance regulates the insurance industry and assists consumers and other stakeholders with insurance issues.

Its statutory mission is consumer protection.

The current Commissioner is Michael Conway (appointed in January 2018) by Governor John Hickenlooper.

References

External links 
 Colorado Division of Insurance
 Colorado Department of Regulatory Agencies

State agencies of Colorado
Insurance in the United States